Prosoplus woodlarkianus is a species of beetle in the family Cerambycidae. It was described by Xavier Montrouzier in 1855. It is known from Papua New Guinea and Australia.

References

Prosoplus
Beetles described in 1855